Gottfried Mind (25 September 1768 – 17 November 1814) was a Swiss savant who specialized in drawing.  He was called the Raphael of Cats because of the excellence with which he painted that animal.

Early life 
Gottfried Mind was born at Bern in the year 1768. His father had come as a joiner and form-cutter to Switzerland from Lipsich, in Upper Hungary. Mind was mostly left to himself because of his weak constitution.

Herr Gruner was a lover of art. During the summer, he had a German artist named Legel in his house who often drew buildings and cattle from nature. This excited the attention of young Mind in some of his idle rambles: he followed Legel everywhere, and watched him while he worked. Legel would take him along with him in his walks, or amuse him in his own apartment with exhibitions of prints. In particular, he allowed the boy to turn over Ridinger's Animals, of which Herr Gruner had a collection; some of these Mind tried to imitate with the lead pencil, preferring above all lions. These attempts Legel from time to time corrected, and the youngster at length ventured to draw from nature, like his master, and to draw some sheep, goats, and cats.

His father, the joiner, however, thought that wood was the only material that was worthy of one's effort and he also considered drawing on paper to be unworthy. Whenever the boy asked paper for drawing, he threw him a bit of wood; Gottfried also tried cutting animals in wood, an art in which he speedily attained such dexterity, that his wooden sheep and goats came to ornament all the presses and mantel-pieces in the village. He also tried drawing likenesses of some peasant boys of Worblaufen, or carving them in wood; and these attempts were not unsuccessful.

Art education 
Mind, in his eighth year, was placed at the academy for poor children, which Pestalozzi had previously instituted at Neuenhof, near Bern, Aargau. In the year 1778, in this authentic account of that institution, published by the Economic Society of Bern, the following short notice:—"Friedly Mynth of Bossi (Mind of Pizy), of the bailliwick of Aubonne, resident in Worblaufen, very weak, incapable of hard work, full of talent for drawing, a strange creature, full of artist-caprices, along with a certain roguishness: drawing is his whole employment: a year and a half here: ten years old."

It is not known how long he remained at this academy; somewhere between the years 1780 and 1785, he came to the painter Sigmund Hendenberger at Bern. With him, Mind learnt his art of drawing, and colouring with water-colours. Mind's education dealt mostly with art; he could with difficulty be made to write his name, and he had not the slightest idea of arithmetic.

Mind's special talent for representing cats was discovered and awakened by chance.  At the time when Hendenberger was painting that since-published picture of the peasant cleaving wood before his cottage, with his wife sitting by, and feeding her child with pap out of a pot, round which a cat is prowling, Mind cast a broad stare on the sketch of this last figure, and said in his rugged, laconic way, "That is no cat!" Hendenberger asked, with a smile, whether Mind thought he could do it better. Mind offered to try; he went into a corner, and drew the cat, which Hendenberger liked so much that he made his new pupil finish it out, and the master copied the scholar's work.

Work 
It was not till after Hendenberger's death that Mind fully developed his peculiar talent for drawing.

His pictures of peasant children, which, for the most part, are painted on small sheets, depict sports, banterings, quarrellings, sledge-parties of children, with their half-frozen but still merry faces, in their puffy yet picturesque costume.

In the course of his narrow, indoors life, he had worked himself into an almost paternal relation with domestic animals, especially with cats. While he sat painting, a cat might generally be seen sitting on his back or on his shoulder; many times he kept, for hours, the most awkward postures, that he might not disturb it. Frequently there was a second cat sitting by him on the table, watching how the work went on; sometimes a kitten or two lay in his lap under the table. Frogs (in bottle) floated beside his easel; and with all these creatures he kept up a most playful, loving style of conversation; though, often enough, any human beings about him, or such even as came to see him, were growled or grunted at in no social fashion.

His chief diligence and most careful elegance he brought to work in the painting of his beloved cats. He had both the art to seize the general nature of this animal and to reflect the specific character of each. The sycophantic look full of falseness, the dainty movements of the kittens, several of which are sometimes painted sporting round their dam—all this, in the most multifarious postures, turns, groups, sports, and quarrels, is depicted with a true observance to nature.

On Sundays and winter nights, Mind, by way of pastime, used, out of dried, wild chestnuts, to carve little cats, bears, and other beasts, and this with so much art that these little dainty toys were shortly in no less request than his drawings. It is a pity that insects, such as frequently exist in the interior of chestnuts, have already destroyed so many of these carvings.

At the Bärengraben (bear-yard) in Bern, where a few live bears are always to be seen, Mind passed many a happy hour. The moment he made his appearance, the bears hastened towards him with friendly grumbling, stationed themselves on their hind feet, and received, impartially, each a piece of bread or an apple out of his pocket. For this reason, bears, next to cats, were a favourite subject of his art; and he reckoned himself, not unjustly, better able to delineate these animals than even celebrated painters have been. Moreover, next to his intercourse with living cats and bears, Mind's greatest joy was in looking at objects of art, especially copper-plates, in which, too, animal figures gave him most satisfaction.

Herr Sigmund Wagner, of Bern, who possessed a choice collection of copper-plates, frequently invited Mind, on winter Sunday evenings to his house, and would then show him his volumes. While Herr Wagner might be writing, reading, or drawing, Mind, grumbled to himself half-aloud, made his remarks on each sheet, and frequently gave a true, stubborn, rugged judgment even on the most celebrated masters, especially on pictures of animals. Among these, nothing pleased him but the lions of Rubens, of Rembrandt, and Potter, and the stags of Kidinger; the other animals of the latter he declared to be falsely drawn. Even the most applauded cats of Cornelis Visscher and Wenzel Hollar could not obtain his approbation.

Mind seldom drew from Nature; at most he did it with a few strokes. His conception was so strong, that whatever he had once strictly observed, stamped itself so firmly in his memory that, on his return home, and often a considerable time afterwards, he could represent it with entire fidelity. On such occasions he would look now and then, as it were, into himself; and when at these moments, he lifted his head, his eyes had something dreamy in them.

Death 
In late 1813, Mind began suffering from "an increasing disorder in the breast" which left him unable to exert himself. On 17 November 1814, he died of this illness, at the age of 46.

See also
Sal Meijer, Dutch artist also known as "The Raphael of Cats"

References 

 Franz Wiedemann: Der Katzenraphael. Lebensbild eines seltsamen Künstlers. 2. Auflage. Oehmigke, Leipzig 1887
 Adolf Koelsch: Gottfried Mind, der Katzen-Raffael. Versuch eines Lebensbildes. Montana, Zürich und Stuttgart 1924
 Katzen. Texte aus der Weltliteratur. Hrsg. von Federico Hindermann. Mit Illustrationen von Gottfried Mind. Manesse im dtv, München 1994

External links 
 

1768 births
1814 deaths
Savants
Outsider artists
Artists from Bern
Swiss artists
Cat artists